The 1904 College Football All-America team is composed of various organizations that chose College Football All-America Teams that season. The organizations that chose the teams included Collier's Weekly selected by Walter Camp.

All-Americans of 1904

Ends
 Tom Shevlin, Yale (College Football Hall of Fame) (WC-1; CW-1; NYS-1; NYT; NYH; PR; NYET; PNA; PI)
 Frederick A. Speik, Chicago (CW-1)
 Ralph Glaze, Dartmouth (WC-3; CW-2; NYH; NYET)
 Garfield Weede, Penn (WC-2; NYS-1; PNA-1)
 Chester T. Neal, Yale (NYS-2; NYT; PI)
 Thomas W. Hammond, Army (NYS-2; PR)
 Alexander Garfield Gillespie, Army (WC-2)
 Claude Rothgeb, Illinois (WC-3; FL)
 Russ, Brown (CW-2)
 James Bush, Wisconsin (FL)

Tackles
 James Hogan, Yale (WC-1; CW-1; NYS-1; NYH; PR; NYET; PNA-1; PI; FL)
 James Cooney, Princeton (WC-1; CW-1; NYS-1; NYT; NYH; PR; NYET; PI)
 Joe Curtis, Michigan (WC-2; FL)
 James R. Bloomer, Yale (CW-2; NYS-2; NYT; PNA-1; FL [sub])
 Tom Thorp, Columbia (WC-2; CW-2; NYS-2)
 Thomas Alexander Butkiewicz, Penn (WC-3)
 Thomas B. Doe, Army (WC-3)

Guards
 Frank Piekarski, Penn (WC-1; CW-1; NYS-1; NYT; NYH; PR; NYET; PNA-1; PI)
 Joseph Gilman, Dartmouth (WC-2; CW-1)
 Ralph Kinney, Yale (WC-1; CW-2 NYS-2; NYT; PNA-1)
 Roswell Tripp, Yale (WC-2; CW-2 NYS-1; NYH; NYET; PI)
 Short, Princeton (WC-3; NYS-2; PR)
 Walton W. Thorp, Minnesota (WC-3; FL)
 Charles A. Fairweather, Illinois (FL)

Centers
 Arthur Tipton, Army (WC-1; CW-1; NYS-1; NYH; PR)
 Clint Roraback, Yale (WC-2; NYS-2; NYT; NYET; PNA-1; PI)
 Robert Grant Torrey, Penn (WC-3; CW-2)
 John M. Haselwood, Illinois (FL)

Quarterbacks
 Vince Stevenson, Penn (WC-1; NYS-2; NYT; PR; PNA-1; PI)
 Foster Rockwell, Yale (WC-2; CW-1; NYS-1; NYH; NYET)
 Sigmund Harris, Minnesota (WC-3)
 Dillwyn Parrish Starr, Harvard (CW-2)

Halfbacks
 Daniel Hurley, Harvard (WC-1; CW-1; NYS-1; NYT; PR; PNA-1; PI) 
 Willie Heston, Michigan (College Football Hall of Fame) (WC-1; NYET; FL)
 Lydig Hoyt, Yale (WC-3; CW-2 [fb]; NYS-1; NYH; PR)
 Jack Owsley, Yale (NYS-2)
 Marshall Reynolds, Penn (WC-2; NYS-2; NYT; PNA-1)
 W. E. Metzenthin, Columbia (NYH)
 Jack Hubbard, Amherst (College Football Hall of Fame) (WC-2; CW-2)
 James Vaughn, Dartmouth (WC-3)
 W. C. Leavenworth, Yale (PI)
 Frederick A. Prince, Army (CW-2)
 Walter L. Foulke, Princeton (FL [sub])

Fullbacks
 Walter Eckersall, Chicago (College Football Hall of Fame) (WC-1 [e]; CW-1; FL [qb]) 
 Andy Smith, Penn (WC-1; NYS-1; NYH; NYET; PNA-1; PI; FL [hb])
 Henry Torney, Army (CW-1 [hb]; NYT; NYET)
 Philip O. Mills, Harvard (WC-2; NYS-2; PR)
 John R. Bender, Nebraska (WC-3)
 Mark Catlin Sr., Chicago (FL)

Key
NCAA recognized selectors for 1904
 WC = Collier's Weekly as selected by Walter Camp
 CW = Caspar Whitney for Outing magazine

Other selectors
 NYS = New York Sun
 NYT = New York Tribune
 NYH = New York Herald
 PR = New York Press
 NYET = New York Evening Telegram
 PNA = Philadelphia North American
 PI = Philadelphia Inquirer
 FL = Fred Lowenthal, coach of the University of Illinois

Bold = Consensus All-American
 1 – First-team selection
 2 – Second-team selection
 3 – Third-team selection

See also
 1904 All-Southern college football team
 1904 All-Western college football team

References

All-America Team
College Football All-America Teams